Coming from Reality is the second and most recent studio album from American singer and songwriter Rodriguez, originally released by Sussex Records in 1971. It was later released in South Africa in 1976 with the alternate title After the Fact.

The album was also reissued on compact disc (CD) by Light in the Attic Records in May 2009. This reissue includes three bonus tracks originally released only in Australia, though they were recorded in Detroit in 1972 with Cold Fact collaborators Mike Theodore and Dennis Coffey, representing the last recordings they ever did together.

Track listing
All songs written by Sixto Rodriguez.

Personnel
 Rodriguez – vocals, guitar
 Chris Spedding – guitars
 Tony Carr – bongos, possible percussion
 Phil Dennys – keyboards
 Jimmy Horowitz – violin on "Sandrevan Lullaby"
 Gary Taylor – bass
 Andrew Steele – drums

Technical
 Steve Rowland – producer
 John Mackswith – engineer
 Recorded at Lansdowne recording studios, London, England late 1970, released in late 1971
 Arranged by Phil Dennys (tracks 3, 5, 7 and 9) 
 Arranged by Jimmy Horowitz (tracks 6, 8 and 10)

Credits

 Clarence Avant – archival materials, photo courtesy
 Milan Bogden – audio engineer
 Tim Burzese – audio engineer
 Tony Carr – percussion
 Dennis Coffey – archival materials, arranger, audio production, photo courtesy, producer
 Vincent Cook – graphic design
 Dave Cooley – remastering
 Phil Dennys – arranger, keyboards
 Chris Ferraro – executive producer
 Tim Forster – archival materials, photo courtesy
 Jimmy Horowitz – arranger, violin
 John MacSwith	– audio engineer, engineer
 Los Rodriguez	– acoustic guitar, primary artist, vocals
 Rodriguez – primary artist
 Sixto Rodriguez – composer
 Steve Rowland – audio production, producer
 John Samson – archival materials, photo courtesy
 Milton Sincoff – merchandising, package direction
 Chris Spedding – guitar
 Andrew Steele – drums
 Matt Sullivan – reissue producer
 Gary Taylor – bass, bass instrument
 Mike Theodore	– archival materials, arranger, audio production, photo courtesy, producer
 Hal Wilson – illustrations, original photography
 Josh Wright – executive producer

Releases
 Coming from Reality LP (Sussex, 1971)
 Coming from Reality CD (Light in the Attic Records, 2009)
 Coming from Reality LP with bonus tracks (Light in the Attic Records, 2009)
 Coming from Reality LP with bonus tracks (Light in the Attic Records, 2009)

Charts

References

External links

1971 albums
Sixto Rodriguez albums
Sussex Records albums
RCA Records albums
A&M Records albums
Albums produced by Steve Rowland (record producer)